is a passenger railway station located in the city of Toride, Ibaraki Prefecture, Japan operated by the East Japan Railway Company (JR East).

Lines
Fujishiro Station is served by the Jōban Line, and is located 43.4 km from the official starting point of the line at Nippori Station.

Station layout
The station consists two opposed side platforms, connected to the elevated station building by a footbridge. The station is staffed.

Platforms

History
Fujishiro Station was opened on 25 December 1896. The current station building was completed in March 1987. The station was absorbed into the JR East network upon the privatization of the Japanese National Railways (JNR) on 1 April 1987.

Passenger statistics
In fiscal 2019, the station was used by an average of 6132 passengers daily (boarding passengers only).

Surrounding area
Fujishiro Post Office

See also
 List of railway stations in Japan

References

External links

 JR East Station Information 

Railway stations in Ibaraki Prefecture
Jōban Line
Railway stations in Japan opened in 1896
Toride, Ibaraki